Vidago, Arcossó, Selhariz e Vilarinho das Paranheiras is a civil parish in the municipality of Chaves, Portugal. It was formed in 2013 by the merger of the former parishes Vidago, Arcossó, Selhariz and Vilarinho das Paranheiras. The population in 2011 was 1,991, in an area of 24.57 km2.

Architecture

Civic
 Agrarian School of Alves Teixeira
 Hotel Palace of Vidago
 Manorhouse of the Machados
 Primary School of Selhariz
 Primary School of Vilarinho de Paranheiros
 Railway Station of Vidago
 Spring of Olmo

Religious
 Chapel of Santo António
 Chapel of São Simão
 Church of Nossa Senhora da Conceição
 Church of São Francisco
 Church of São Tomé
 Cross of Vidago
 Sanctuary of Alto do Côto

References

Freguesias of Chaves, Portugal